Old Stone House may refer to:

 Old Stone House (Hampton, Iowa)
 Stone House by the Stone House Brook (South Orange, New Jersey)
 Old Stone House (Brooklyn), New York
 Old Stone House (Granite Quarry, North Carolina)
 Old Stone House (Vale, Oregon)
 Old Stone House (Winnsboro, South Carolina)
 Old Stone House (Winooski, Vermont)
 Old Stone House Museum, in Brownington Village, Vermont
 Old Stone House (Richmond, Virginia)/Edgar Allan Poe Museum
 Old Stone House (Millboro Springs, Virginia)
 Old Stone House (Washington, D.C.)
 Old Stone House (Morgantown, West Virginia)
 Old Stone House (Pennsboro, West Virginia)
 Wallace Estill Sr. House, near Union, West Virginia

See also
 Old Stone House (Hampton, Iowa), an 1853 NRHP-listed building
 Old Stone House Library, an 1825 NHRP-listed building in Fort Ann, New York
 Stone House (disambiguation)